"The Way Young Lovers Do" is a song by Northern Irish singer-songwriter Van Morrison from his second solo album, Astral Weeks.  It was recorded in 1968, at Century Sound Studios New York City, during September and October of that year. The song is in triple metre. The distinctive feel of the original recording emerges from the non-rock style of double-bass phrasing by veteran jazzman Richard Davis and additional jazz musician session players, which combined with Morrison's soulful vocals, creates a relatively unusual combination of stylistic elements.

Brian Hinton believes that "The song is about growing up, an adolescent first kiss, and still conveys the same sweet mystery as 'Astral Weeks' but more upfront."

In Ritchie Yorke's biography on Van Morrison he comments that Van Morrison told him, "On the second side 'Young Lovers Do' is just basically a song about young love" and that Morrison then laughed mysteriously.

In a 1969 issue of Rolling Stone about Astral Weeks  Greil Marcus remarks: "It is pointless to discuss this album in terms of each particular track; with the exception of 'Young Lovers Do', a poor jazz-flavored cut that is uncomfortably out of place on this record, it's all one song, very much 'A Day in the Life.'"

In his review, Scott Thomas writes:
"The Way Young Lovers Do" is an interesting one. On its surface, with its images of tranquil lovers walking through fields and kissing on front stoops, it seems to deliver the romantic bliss anticipated so fervently in "Sweet Thing".  The music, however, betrays some disturbing undercurrents.

In the media
"The Way Young Lovers Do" was one of the songs in the soundtrack of the 1997 movie, Welcome to Sarajevo.

Appearance on other albums
"The Way Young Lovers Do" was featured on Morrison's album Astral Weeks Live at the Hollywood Bowl, released in 2009 to celebrate forty years since Astral Weeks was first released. A jazz arrangement is featured on the 2018 album he recorded with organist Joey DeFrancesco entitled You're Driving Me Crazy.

Personnel
Van Morrison – vocals, acoustic guitar
Richard Davis – double bass
Connie Kay – drums
Barry Kornfeld – guitar
John Payne – flute
Warren Smith, Jr. – percussion, vibraphone
Larry Fallon – string and horn arrangements

Covers
Maria McKee included a cover of "The Way Young Lovers Do" on her 1993 album, You Gotta Sin to Get Saved.
A cover of "The Way Young Lovers Do" is included on Jeff Buckley's first live EP Live at Sin-é released in 1993, and therefore is also included on Buckley's 2004 posthumously released Live at Sin-é (Legacy Edition), which provides the full recording of the 1993 Sin-é concert.
Starsailor released their version of this song as a B-side on their second single, Good Souls, released in April 2001.
The Winding Stair
Hugh Cornwell included a version of "The Way Young Lovers Do" on his 2011 album You're Covered.
Mick Harvey covered it on his 2013 album Four (Acts of Love).

Notes

References
Hinton, Brian (1997). Celtic Crossroads: The Art of Van Morrison, Sanctuary, 
Yorke, Ritchie (1975). Into The Music, London:Charisma Books, 

1968 songs
Van Morrison songs
Jeff Buckley songs
Songs written by Van Morrison
Song recordings produced by Lewis Merenstein